In mathematics, in the field of ordinary differential equations, Sturm separation theorem, named after Jacques Charles François Sturm, describes the location of roots of solutions of  homogeneous second order linear differential equations. Basically the theorem states that given two linear independent solutions of such an equation the zeros of the two solutions are alternating.

Sturm separation theorem 

If u(x) and v(x) are two non-trivial continuous linearly independent solutions to a homogeneous second order linear differential equation with x0 and x1 being successive roots of u(x), then v(x) has exactly one root in the open interval (x0, x1). It is a special case of the Sturm-Picone comparison theorem.

Proof 

Without loss of generality, suppose that . Then

So at 

Without loss of generality, suppose that they are both positive. Now, at  

Thus, to keep  we must have . So somewhere in the interval  the sign of  changed. By the Intermediate Value Theorem there exists  such that .

References 

Ordinary differential equations
Theorems in analysis